Champion Lakes is a suburb of Perth, Western Australia in the City of Armadale. 

The suburb was originally part of Camillo, but was renamed along with the proposal for a large water-based recreation facility that was constructed in the area, Champion Lakes Regatta Centre.

References

External links

Suburbs of Perth, Western Australia
Suburbs in the City of Armadale